Devsar  (or Qasba/Bona Devsar) is a town and tehsil notified area committee in Kulgam district in the Indian union territory of Jammu and Kashmir. It is one of the seven administrative blocks of the Kulgam district. The city is connected to Kulgam and Qazigund by a two-lane road (NH444). This road has been funded by Asian Development Bank. Devsar is home to various religious places or Shrines. The famous among these could be  Hazrat Khan Sb ,Hazrat Ameer Kabeer , Ded Moj Sb and many Hindu Temples including Mata Tripur Sundari Khanabarani.

References

Cities and towns in Kulgam district
Kulgam district